Black Snake Moan may refer to:
 "That Black Snake Moan", a song recorded in 1927 by Blind Lemon Jefferson
 Black Snake Moan, a British blues band briefly fronted by Robert Plant of Led Zeppelin
  Black Snake Moan (film), a 2006 film directed by Craig Brewer starring Samuel L. Jackson and Christina Ricci